This article provides a listing, with brief descriptions, of the most traveled or best known streets and thoroughfares in Ponce, Puerto Rico. Unless otherwise noted, traffic is two-way. If traffic is two-way for the entire length of the street (as opposed to just a portion of its length), it is designated with the symbol "↔" under the column "Traffic direction"; otherwise, the dash symbol ("–") is used.

List of streets

See also

 List of highways in Ponce, Puerto Rico

References

External links

 

Transportation in Ponce, Puerto Rico
Ponce metropolitan area
Puerto Rico transport-related lists
Ponce, Puerto Rico-related lists
Ponce